The Public Defense (Hebrew: הסניגוריה הציבורית) is a department of the Ministry of Justice of Israel that provides legal representation to criminal suspects and defendants without means to hire an attorney. It also provides representation to those involuntarily committed to mental institutions. It was founded in 1996 in accordance with the Public Defense Act of 1995. Legal representation by the Public Defender's Office is provided free of charge, and the attorneys' fees are paid directly to them from the state budget, according to a fixed rate determined by law. It employs 100 full-time lawyers and outsources to another 900 lawyers.

External links
 Public Defence official website 

Israel
Law of Israel